Phạm Cao Cường (born 30 May 1996) is a Vietnamese badminton player. He was born in badminton family, his brothers Cao Hiếu and Cao Thắng are former national players. He had shown his potential as a badminton player when he was young, and at age 16, he reach in the top 8 at the National Championships in the men's singles event. His parents and Ho Chi Minh City Sports Department decided to send him to be trained in Indonesia under coach Asep Suharno. In the junior event, he was the runner-up at the U-19 Korea Junior Open in 2013. Phạm competed at the 2014 Summer Youth Olympics and Asian Games. He emerged as the champion at the 2018 Iran Fajr International by defeating his senior teammateNguyễn Tiến Minh in the final.

Achievements

BWF International Challenge/Series (2 titles, 1 runner-up) 
Men's singles

  BWF International Challenge tournament
  BWF International Series tournament
  BWF Future Series tournament

References

External links 
 

1996 births
Living people
People from Thái Bình province
Vietnamese male badminton players
Badminton players at the 2014 Summer Youth Olympics
Badminton players at the 2014 Asian Games
Badminton players at the 2018 Asian Games
Asian Games competitors for Vietnam
Competitors at the 2015 Southeast Asian Games
Competitors at the 2017 Southeast Asian Games
Southeast Asian Games competitors for Vietnam